"Baby, It's Cold Outside" is a popular song written by Frank Loesser in 1944 and popularized in the 1949 film Neptune's Daughter. While the lyrics make no mention of a holiday, it is commonly regarded as a Christmas song owing to its winter theme.  The song was released in eight recordings in 1949 and has been covered numerous times since.

History
In 1944, Loesser wrote "Baby, It's Cold Outside" to sing with his wife, Lynn Garland, at their housewarming party in New York City at the Navarro Hotel. They sang the song to indicate to guests that it was time to leave. Garland has written that after the first performance, "We became instant parlor room stars. We got invited to all the best parties for years on the basis of 'Baby.' It was our ticket to caviar and truffles. Parties were built around our being the closing act." In 1948, after years of performing the song, Loesser sold it to MGM for the 1949 romantic comedy Neptune's Daughter. Garland was furious: "I felt as betrayed as if I'd caught him in bed with another woman."

According to Esther Williams, the producers of Neptune's Daughter had planned to use a different Loesser song, "(I'd Like to Get You on a) Slow Boat to China", but studio censors thought it was too suggestive and replaced it with "Baby."

The song won the 1950 Academy Award for Best Original Song.

Lyrics
The song is a call and response duet between two people, a host (called "Wolf" in the score, usually performed by a male singer) and a guest (called "Mouse", usually performed by a female). Every line in the song features a statement from the guest followed by a response from the host. The lyrics consist of the host trying to convince the guest that she should stay for a romantic evening because he fears her getting too cold outside, despite the fact that she feels she should return home to her concerned family and neighbors. In the film Neptune's Daughter, the song is first performed by Ricardo Montalbán and Esther Williams, then with a comic parody twist by Betty Garrett and Red Skelton: this time the man wants to leave and the woman wants him to stay.

In at least one published version the tempo of the song is given as "Loesserando", a humorous reference to the composer's name.

Controversy 
Since 2009, the song has faced criticism among some listeners for the alleged implications of its lyrics, with elements such as the line "Say, what's in this drink?" and the "Wolf's" unrelenting pressure for the "Mouse" to remain in spite of her repeated suggestions that she should go home being described as suggestive of sexual harassment or even date rape.

However, others have noted that cultural expectations at the time of the song's writing were such that women were not socially permitted to spend the night with a boyfriend or fiancé and that the woman states that she wants to stay, while "What's in this drink?" was a common idiom of the period used to sidestep social expectations by blaming one's actions on the influence of alcohol. Susan Loesser, the daughter of songwriter Frank Loesser, attributed the controversy to the song being associated with Bill Cosby after television programs such as Saturday Night Live and South Park satirically depicted it being performed by the comedian, who had been accused of sexually assaulting numerous women and was convicted in one case that would eventually be overturned.

In 2018, the airing of the song was cancelled by a number of radio stations including Canada's CBC streaming service, after social media criticism and public pressure regarding the song's lyrics. This was referred to by some media outlets as part of a wider 'cancel culture' at the time of works liable to offend people. On November 30, 2018, Cleveland, Ohio, radio station WDOK Star 102 announced that it had removed the song from its playlist due to its lyric content, based on listener input, amid the Me Too movement. On December 4, 2018, the Canadian radio broadcasters Bell Media, CBC Radio, and Rogers Media followed suit. The decision was divisive among critics and the general public, with supporters arguing that the song's possible implications of date rape did not align with current societal norms, and others arguing that the decision was an appeal to political correctness. Station KOIT in San Francisco, having placed the song "on hold" pending listener feedback, returned it to the playlist after 77% of respondents opposed its removal. CBC Radio subsequently reinstated the song as well. Following the controversy, the song rose to the top 10 of Billboard digital sales list for the week of December 22, 2018, with a 70% increase in downloads.

In 2019, vocalists John Legend and Kelly Clarkson also recorded the song with modified lyrics, written by Legend and Natasha Rothwell for an expanded edition of Legend's A Legendary Christmas album. The lyrical changes, which included lines from the "Wolf" emphasizing sexual consent, became a new source of controversy in their own right. Deana Martin, whose father Dean Martin had recorded a popular version of the song in 1959, criticized the new interpretation as "absurd", saying her father would not have approved of altering the lyrics (which she maintained to be more sexually explicit in the new version than in Loesser's original) in order to appease contemporary sensibilities.

1949 recordings
 Don Cornell and Laura Leslie with Sammy Kaye and his orchestra; recorded on April 12 and released by RCA Victor (peaked at No. 12 on Billboard Records Most Played By Disk Jockeys chart, at No. 13 on Billboard Best-Selling Popular Retail Records chart [lasting ten weeks on the chart], and at No. 17 on Billboard Most-Played Juke Box Records chart in mid-1949)
 Bing Crosby and James Stewart, abbreviated radio performance with Stewart taking the "mouse" part, from The Bing Crosby – Chesterfield Show; released on The Bing Crosby Christmas Gift Collection
 Doris Day and Bob Hope; radio performance from The Bob Hope Show
 Ella Fitzgerald and Louis Jordan with the Tympany Five; recorded on April 28 and released by Decca Records (peaked at No. 9 on Billboard Most-Played Juke Box Records chart and No. 17 on Billboard Best-Selling Popular Retail Records chart [lasting seven weeks on the latter chart] in mid-1949)
 Lynn Garland and Frank Loesser (credited as Lynn & Frank Loesser); released by Mercury Records
 Homer and Jethro and June Carter; released by RCA Victor (peaked at No. 22 on Billboard Records Most Played By Disk Jockeys chart on the week ending August 20, 1949)
 Dean Martin and Marilyn Maxwell; radio performance from The Martin and Lewis Show; released on several compilations, including The Very Best of Dean Martin and Relax, It's Dean Martin, Vol 2
 Dinah Shore and Buddy Clark with Ted Dale and his orchestra; recorded on March 17 and released by Columbia Records (peaked at No. 3 on Billboard Records Most Played By Disk Jockeys chart, at No. 4 on Billboard Best-Selling Popular Retail Records chart, and No. 6 on Billboard Most-Played Juke Box Records chart in mid-1949)
 Margaret Whiting and Johnny Mercer with Paul Weston and his orchestra; recorded on March 18 and released by Capitol Records (peaked at No. 3 on Billboard Records Most Played By Disk Jockeys chart, at No. 4 on Billboard Best-Selling Popular Retail Records chart [lasting 19 weeks on the chart], and No. 8 on Billboard Most-Played Juke Box Records chart in mid-1949)

Other recordings
As of 2020, there are over 400 recordings of the song. The following list is incomplete.

Charts

Dean Martin version

Ray Charles and Betty Carter version

Tom Jones and Cerys Matthews version

Ella Fitzgerald and Louis Jordan version

Glee Cast version

Willie Nelson and Norah Jones version

She & Him version

Lady Antebellum / Lady A version

Kelly Clarkson and Ronnie Dunn version

Idina Menzel and Michael Bublé version

Brett Eldredge and Meghan Trainor version

John Legend and Kelly Clarkson version

Year-end charts

Idina Menzel and Michael Bublé version

Brett Eldredge and Meghan Trainor version

Certifications

Dean Martin version

Idina Menzel and Michael Bublé version

Brett Eldredge and Meghan Trainor version

See also
 List of Billboard Adult Contemporary number ones of 2014, 2015, and 2017 (U.S.)

References

External links
 
 27 Takes On Frank Loesser's 'Baby, It's Cold Outside' Broadwayworld
 Is 'Baby, It's Cold Outside' About Date Rape? Snopes. Includes 1949 recording by the Loessers

1944 songs
1949 singles
Songs written by Frank Loesser
American Christmas songs
Best Original Song Academy Award-winning songs
Male–female vocal duets
Obscenity controversies in music
Songs with feminist themes
Pop standards